Phulamuthi (also known as Fulmuthi) is a village of Subarnapur district of Odisha. It is surrounded by two water streams namely Choukijor and Nalia. The village is famous for its green surroundings.

Celebration
The village celebrates major festivals of western Odisha such as Bhaijuntia, Puajuntia, Nuakhai together. They also celebrate major Indian festival like Dushara, Holi, Dewali.

Nuakhai Bhet Ghat 
Nukhai is one of the major festivals of the western part of Odisha. It is also observed in some parts of Jharkhand and Bihar. On this day, people from western Odisha celebrate across the globe by eating nua (new paddy) followed by different kinds of delicious dishes. People of Phulamuthi celebrate it as a special occasion. They eat nua and greet all. It is followed by much entertainment. People from neighboring villages also participate in the late night entertainment.

Education
There is primary education available up to class 7. For high school education they rely on the nearest village.

Government Primary School for class 1–5
Maa maheswari Upper Primary School for class 6–7
Pre-primary education available.

Temples
Maa maheswari temple
Maa metakani temple

Occupation
Majority of people depend upon paddy farming. Some of them depend on vegetable farming, whereas the rest depend on weaving sari.

Politics

The village comes under Charda panchayat of Binika block of sonepur district of Odisha. Its assembly-constituency is Birmaharajpur and  Parliamentary Constituency is Bolangir.

References

Villages in Subarnapur district